Lindale Independent School District is a public school district based in Lindale, Texas (USA), and is designated as "Exemplary" (2010–2011) for its quality by the Texas Education Agency.

In addition to Lindale, the district serves the residential community of Hideaway and areas in northwestern Smith County. A small portion of eastern Van Zandt County also lies within the district.

Schools

High School (Grades 9-12)
Lindale High School

Junior High School (Grades 7-8)
Lindale Junior High School

Intermediate Schools (Grades 4-6)
E.J. Moss Intermediate School (East campus)
E.J. Moss Intermediate School (West campus)

Elementary Schools (Grades 1-3)
Velma Penny Elementary School
College Street Elementary School

Childhood Center (Grades PK-K)
Lindale Early Childhood Center

External links
Lindale ISD

School districts in Smith County, Texas
School districts in Van Zandt County, Texas